Tmolus may refer to:

 Tmolus (son of Ares), mythical Greek king of Lydia and husband to Omphale, known in Greek mythology as a mountain god, son of Ares
 Mount Tmolus, Greek mountain range named for the mythical figure
 Tmolus (father of Tantalus), mythical Greek king of Lydia and father of Tantalus
 Tmolus (butterfly), a genus of butterflies in the family Lycaenidae
 Tmolus (town) or Aureliopolis in Lydia, a city in the Roman province of Lydia situated on Mount Tmolus

See also
 Bozdağ, a town in Turkey formerly called Tmolos